The Kids Are Alright is a soundtrack album by the British rock band The Who, a companion to the band's documentary film of the same name. As a compilation album, it serves as a retrospective look at the band's biggest hits throughout their career to the point it was released. Most of the tracks are live recordings, rather than the original studio versions.

It was originally released as a double album in June 1979 on Polydor Records in the UK and MCA Records in the US. The performance of "My Wife" was from a concert The Who filmed for The Kids Are Alright at the Gaumont State Cinema in Kilburn; however the footage was not used in the film. That show was later restored for DVD and released as The Who at Kilburn: 1977 in 2008. "Tommy Can You Hear Me" had a longer outro with Roger Daltrey repeating the word "Tommy" before Keith Moon screams "'Ello!" to end the song. The soundtrack album did well in the US where it peaked at No. 8 on the Billboard albums chart and went platinum, while it peaked at No. 26 on the UK charts.

The Kids Are Alright soundtrack album was reissued in its original packaging with the 20-page booklet and two LPs on coloured vinyl (LP1 on red vinyl, LP2 on blue vinyl) for Record Store Day in 2018.

Track listing
All tracks written and composed by Pete Townshend, except where noted.

Vinyl track listing 
{| width = 100%
| valign=top width = 50% |
Reel One
 "My Generation"
 "I Can't Explain"
 "Happy Jack"
 "I Can See for Miles"
 "Magic Bus" 
 "Long Live Rock"
Reel Two
 "Anyway, Anyhow, Anywhere"
 "Young Man Blues"
 "My wife"
 "Baba O'Riley"
Reel Three
 "A Quick One"
 "Tommy Can You Hear Me?"
 "Sparks"
 "Pinball Wizard"
 "See Me, Feel Me"
Reel Four
 "Join Together"
 "Roadrunner"
 "My Generation Blues"
 "Won't Get Fooled Again"

Personnel
The Who
 Roger Daltrey – vocals, harmonica
 Pete Townshend – guitars, keyboards, vocals
 John Entwistle – bass guitar, keyboards, vocals, musical director
 Keith Moon – drums, vocals

Design
 Bill Curbishley – sleeve concept
 Chris Chappel – sleeve concept
 Richard Evans – sleeve concept, design, illustration
 Art Kane – photography
 Michael Zagaris – photography
 Roy Carr – liner notes

Charts

Certifications

References

Documentary film soundtracks
The Who soundtracks
1979 soundtrack albums
MCA Records soundtracks
Polydor Records soundtracks